Peter David Manley (born 7 March 1962) is an English former professional darts player who played in Professional Darts Corporation (PDC) events from July 1996 until 2017. He won one major title, the Las Vegas Desert Classic, in 2003, and twice held the number one ranking. He also reached the World Championship final in 1999, 2002 and 2006, losing to Phil Taylor on each occasion. Declining form led to him losing his place on the PDC tour in 2011. 

Manley was nicknamed "One Dart" by commentator Tony Green after hitting the winning double on numerous occasions with his first dart during his first televised appearance at the 1995 Unipart European Masters, where he eventually lost in the final to Mike Gregory. Manley was also known for his walk on and personality. Described as someone whom "darts crowds love to hate", his antics sometimes led to run-ins with fellow players.

Darting career
Manley made his debut in 1996 PDC World Matchplay Last 40 to Paul Cook, 5–2, in Last 32 to Dave Kelly 8-2 and Last 16 his losing to Jamie Harvey, 8–3.

Manley's controversial personality rather than the quality of his darts was often the most notable part of his career and continued poor form resulted in his failure to secure a PDC tour card in 2012. Manley lost several major sponsors including darts manufacturer Unicorn as a result.
 
Manley is perhaps most famous for his long-running feud with Phil Taylor resulting from his refusal to shake Taylor's hand after losing 7–0 to him in the 2002 PDC World Darts Championship final. He has finished runner-up to Taylor in two other World Championships - losing 6-2 in 1999 and 7-0 in 2006.

His biggest tournament win was 2003 Las Vegas Desert Classic when he beat John Part 16-12 in the final. He is also the chairman of the Professional Dart Players Association, a position he has held for six years. Manley attempted getting a PDC Tour card in the Q-School in 2012, 2013, 2014, 2015, 2016, 2017, 2018 and 2019 but was unsuccessful.

In 2022, Manley appeared in the inaugural World Seniors Darts Championship and reached the second round, where after winning against former BDO world finalist, Deta Hedman 3 - 1 he suffered a 3 - 1 defeat to old time rival Phil Taylor. Although not competing in the 2022 World Seniors Darts Masters, he made an appearance at the 2022 World Seniors Darts Matchplay in which he managed to reach the Quarter Finals after beating John Part in a deciding leg. His run was then ended once more by Phil Taylor. Manley entered the Modus Online Super League, in December 2022 in preparation for the 2023 World Seniors Darts Championship in which he pulled off a 4 - 2 win over Alan Norris.

Crowd popularity

Manley's refusal to shake Taylor's hand after his 7-0 World Championship thrashing in 2002 led to darts fans booing him for many years. The boos became more ironic and good-natured when in 2005 Manley changed his entrance theme from Chumbawamba's Tubthumping to Tony Christie's "Is This the Way to Amarillo". By the end of his career Manley was seen by darts crowds as being more of a 'pantomime villain' rather than subject to genuine animosity which had occurred previously.  Manley has gone on to say that whilst the booing and crowd reaction was hard for him and his family to take in the early days, it helped him as his career went on and ensured his popularity on the exhibition circuit.

Controversy

Despite being chairman of the Players' Union (the Professional Dart Players Association - PDPA), Manley was often the subject of controversy with fellow players. Most notably Taylor in the aforementioned incident, and also in the 2006 PDC World Darts Championship. During that tournament, Manley was accused of gamesmanship against Dennis Smith and in a later round against Taylor's protégé, Adrian Lewis. Manley muttered words to his opponent, resulting in Lewis leaving the stage in anger. Despite serving as Mardle's best man at his wedding Manley also had a notable spat with the former PDC professional player Wayne Mardle. Mardle accused Manley of being a cheat in his autobiography. Manley has also had notable spats with the likes of Roland Scholten, John Lowe, Rod Harrington, Dave Jowett and Wynand Havenga.

World Championship results

PDC
 1997: Preliminary round (lost to Chris Mason 0–3)
 1998: Quarter-finals (lost to Dennis Priestley 3–4)
 1999: Runner-up (lost to Phil Taylor 2–6)
 2000: Semi-finals (lost to Dennis Priestley 2–5)
 2001: First round (lost to Jamie Harvey 2–3)
 2002: Runner-up (lost to Phil Taylor 0–7)
 2003: Second round (lost to Simon Whitlock 1–4)
 2004: Quarter-finals (lost to Bob Anderson 2–5)
 2005: Third round (lost to Josephus Schenk 2–4)
 2006: Runner-up (lost to Phil Taylor 0–7)
 2007: Second round (lost to Wynand Havenga 3–4)
 2008: Quarter-finals (lost to Kirk Shepherd 4–5)
 2009: First round (lost to Mensur Suljović 2–3)
 2010: Second round (lost to Mark Webster 2–4)

WSDT
 2022: Second round (lost to Phil Taylor 1–3)
 2023: First round (lost to Scott Mitchell 0–3)

Career finals

PDC major finals: 5 (1 title, 4 runners-up)

Independent major finals: 1 (1 runner-up)

Career statistics

(W) Won; (F) finalist; (SF) semifinalist; (QF) quarterfinalist; (#R) rounds 6, 5, 4, 3, 2, 1; (RR) round-robin stage; (Prel.) Preliminary round; (DNQ) Did not qualify; (DNP) Did not participate; (NH) Not held

Performance timeline

References

External links
Peter Manley's official website

Player profile and stats on Darts Database

English darts players
1962 births
Living people
Professional Darts Corporation former tour card holders
Las Vegas Desert Classic champions